Sherali" Jorayev is an Uzbek singer, songwriter, poet, and actor. He is the People's artist of Uzbekistan. He has been an influential figure in Uzbek cultural life for almost four decades. Much of his most celebrated work dates from the 1980s and 1990s.

Jorayev's lyrics have incorporated a variety of political, social, philosophical, and literary influences. Some of his lyrics have become part of everyday Uzbek vocabulary. While Joʻrayev usually writes both the music and lyrics to his songs, he has also used lines from the poems of Ali-Shir Nava'i, Babur, Jami, and Rumi in his songs.

In 1988, Jorayev wrote a book entitled Bola dunyoni tebratar (The Child is the Master of Earth). He wrote the screenplay and played the leading role in the 1989 film Sherali va Oybarchin (Sherali and Oybarchin). He was a member of the Supreme Assembly of Uzbekistan from 1990 to 1995.

From 2002, Uzbek government authorities banned Jorayev's appearance on Uzbek television and radio. He fell out of favor with the Uzbek government for his critical remarks about the difficult economic situation in the country. In 2017, one year after the death of Islam Karimov, Jorayev was briefly shown on state television.

Jorayev has won dozens of awards and nominations, including the title People's Artist of the Uzbek SSR (1987). In 1991, he received the Alisher Navoiy State Prize. On April 12, 2022, Jurayev received an order of "El-yurt xurmati" on his 75th anniversary.

Life 
Sherali Jorayev was born in 1947 in Asaka, then the Uzbek SSR, USSR. His exact birthday is unknown. He symbolically chose 12 April to be his birthday. Jorayev has stated that another reason he chose this date is because he entered inside of Kaaba.

Jorayev graduated from the Uzbekistan State Institute of Arts and Culture in 1976. He has 2 sons and 3 daughters. Two of his sons, Shohjahon Joʻrayev and Zohir Shoh Joʻrayev, are became popular singers in Uzbekistan.

Professional career 
From 1972 until 1979, Jorayev worked at the Shodlik Song and Dance Ensemble. From 1979 to 1986, he worked at the Andijan Province Philharmonic. From 1986 to 1996, he worked at the Uzbek State Philharmonic. Jorayev was a member of the Supreme Assembly of Uzbekistan from 1990 to 1995.

Throughout his long career, Jorayev has written and recorded hundreds of songs. His most famous songs include "Bahor ayyomi" ("Springtime") (lyrics taken from a Babur poem), "Birinchi muhabbatim" ("My First Love") (lyrics taken from an Abdulla Oripov poem), "Inson qasidasi" ("The Ode to Man") (lyrics taken from an Erkin Vohidov poem), "Karvon" ("Caravan") (lyrics taken from an Usmon Azim poem), "Meni kutgil" ("Wait for Me") (lyrics taken from a Konstantin Simonov poem), "Oshiqlar sardori" ("The Leader of Lovers") (lyrics taken from a Rasul Gamzatov poem), "Oʻzbegim" ("My Uzbek People") (lyrics taken from an Erkin Vohidov poem), "Oʻxshamas" ("Peerless") (lyrics taken from an Ali-Shir Nava'i poem), and many others.

Jorayev's lyrics have incorporated a variety of political, social, philosophical, and literary influences. Some of his lyrics have become part of everyday Uzbek vocabulary. He is often invited to other countries, including Kyrgyzstan, Tajikistan, and Russia. While Jorayev usually writes both the music and lyrics to his songs, he has also used lines from the poems of Ali-Shir Nava'i, Babur, Jami, and Rumi in his songs. In 2008, Juraev organized gatherings at his home to celebrate the works of Rumi.

In 1988, Jorayev wrote a book entitled Bola dunyoni tebratar (The Child is the Master of Earth). Juraev wrote the screenplay and played the leading role in the 1989 film Sherali va Oybarchin (Sherali and Oybarchin).

Jorayev's song Ozbegim was featured on the 2005 album Rough Guide to the Music of Central Asia which was released by World Music Network. In honor of Queen Elizabeth II's 78th birthday, British Ambassador Craig Murray welcomed more than a thousand guests to his residence in Tashkent on 23 April 2004. The celebrations featured Jorayev, Sevara Nazarkhan, and the Chamber Orchestra conducted by Vladimir Neimer. At the same time the British Embassy arranged a tour of Uzbekistan by Scotland's Battlefield Band, with whom Joʻrayev performed at the residency before a large and influential audience.

Censorship 
In 2002 Uzbek government authorities banned Jorayev's appearance on Uzbek television and radio stations because of his "alleged political unreliability". He fell out of favor with the Uzbek government for his critical remarks about the difficult economic situation in the country. The singer generally avoids talking about the ban in public. In 2017, one year after the death of Islam Karimov, Joʻrayev was briefly shown on state television.

Filmography

Actor

Screenwriter

Awards 
Jorayev has won dozens of awards and nominations, including the title People's Artist of the Uzbek SSR (1987). In 1991, he received the Alisher Navoiy State Prize.

References

External links 
Lyrics to Sherali Jorayev songs 

1947 births
Living people
People from Andijan Region
Soviet male singers
Soviet male film actors
Uzbekistani male film actors
20th-century Uzbekistani male singers
20th-century Uzbekistani male actors
Uzbekistani actor-politicians
Members of the Supreme Assembly (Uzbekistan)
Uzbekistani composers
Uzbekistani screenwriters
Soviet screenwriters